Mogens Dahl Nielsen (born 12 May 1972) is a former Danish cricketer.  Nielsen was a right-handed batsman who bowled leg break.  He was born at Nykøbing Mors, Viborg County.

Nielsen made his List A debut for Denmark in the 1999 NatWest Trophy against the Kent Cricket Board.  His international cricket debut for Denmark came in the 2000 ICC Emerging Nations Tournament against Zimbabwe A.  During the tournament he played 2 further List A matches against the Netherlands and Scotland.  Nielsen's final List A match for Denmark came in the 2000 NatWest Trophy against the Durham Cricket Board.  In his 5 List A matches for Denmark, he scored 58 runs at a batting average of 19.33, with a high score of 49*.  With the ball he took 2 wickets at a bowling average of 42.00, with best figures of 1/16.

References

External links
Mogens Dahl Nielsen at ESPNcricinfo
Mogens Dahl Nielsen at CricketArchive

1972 births
Living people
Danish cricketers
People from Morsø Municipality
Sportspeople from the North Jutland Region